Russell Henderson may refer to:

Russell Henderson (1924–2015), British-Caribbean jazz musician 
Russell Henderson (convict), in the 1998 hate crime murder of Matthew Shepard in Wyoming